A Terra de Lemos is a comarca in the Galician Province of Lugo. The overall population of this  local region is 30,151 (2019).

Municipalities
Bóveda, Monforte de Lemos, Pantón, A Pobra do Brollón, O Saviñao and Sober.

References

Comarcas of the Province of Lugo